Campanula balfourii is a species of flowering plant in the bellflower family Campanulaceae. It is endemic to northeastern Socotra, Yemen.  Its natural habitat is subtropical or tropical dry forests.

Description
Delicate, erect herb to 15 cm, with spreading hairs. Leaves broadly oblong-elliptic to orbicular, 0.5-1 x 0.3–07 cm. Flowers lilac-blue, <0.8 cm long, sessile.

Ecology
Clearings in semi-deciduous woodland, 500–750 m. This delicate annual with its small pretty flowers, appears soon after rain but rapidly dies back in the dry season.

Conservation status
Least concern (LC). Common in several vegetation types and under no present or perceived threat.

References

Endemic flora of Socotra
balfourii
Least concern plants
Taxonomy articles created by Polbot